Drasteria sinuosa is a moth of the family Erebidae. It is found in Turkey, Iran, Kazakhstan, Tajikistan, Uzbekistan, Afghanistan and Turkmenistan.

References

Drasteria
Moths described in 1884
Moths of Asia
Taxa named by Otto Staudinger